Marcon (or Marcón) is the surname of:

Film and television
 André Marcon (born 1948), French actor
 Kirstin Marcon (fl. since 2000), New Zealand screenwriter and film director

Sport
 Adam Marcon (born 1992), Australian rules footballer
 Eliomar Marcón (born 1975), Brazilian footballer, mostly for Mexican clubs
 Francesca Marcon (born 1983), Italian volleyball player
 Lou Marcon (born 1935), Canadian ice hockey player
 Paul Marcon (born 1995), French rugby league player
 Sergio Marcon (born 1970), Italian football goalkeeper for various Italian clubs
 Sholto Marcon (1890–1959), English field hockey player, gold medallist at the 1920 Olympics
 Walter Marcon (1824–1875), English cricketer

Other
 Régis Marcon (born 1956), French chef and restaurateur
 Charles Abdy Marcon (1853–1953), English clergyman, Master of Marcon's Hall of Oxford University
 Andrea Marcon (born 1963), Italian conductor, organist and harpsichordist

See also
 Macron § People for people surnamed Macron
 Emmanuel Macron, President of France